South Korea, as Republic of Korea, competed at the 1964 Winter Olympics in Innsbruck, Austria.

Alpine skiing

Men

Cross-country skiing

Men

Speed skating

Men

Women

References
Official Olympic Reports

Korea, South
1964
1964 in South Korean sport